Thelur is a village in the Ariyalur taluk of Ariyalur district, Tamil Nadu, India.

Demographics 
As per the 2001 census, Thelur had a total population of 3,528 with 1,788 males and 1,740 females.

References 

Villages in Ariyalur district